In the 2017 dengue outbreak in Peshawar, Pakistan, hundreds of incidents of dengue fever were reported in Peshawar in mid-2017. Initially, according to the health department of Khyber Pakhtunkhwa, 4,320 suspected cases were received by Khyber Teaching Hospital Peshawar and 831 were positive. About a dozen people died of dengue, starting in July. Punjab healthcare experts and Peshawar experts worked together to control the dengue epidemic, using health workers going door-to-door to educate residents, as well as fumigation of the city to suppress mosquito populations.

In November 2017, the World Health Organization reported a total of 24,807 laboratory confirmed cases with 69 deaths.

See also 
 2011 dengue outbreak in Pakistan

References 

2017 in Pakistan
Peshawar
2017 disease outbreaks
History of Peshawar
2017